Odio serrano  is a 1924 silent Argentine film directed and written by José A. Ferreyra. The film premiered in 1924 in Buenos Aires.

Cast
Nelo Cosimi
Yolanda Labardén
Héctor Míguez
Antonio Prieto

External links
 

1924 films
1920s Spanish-language films
Argentine black-and-white films
Argentine silent films
Films directed by José A. Ferreyra